
The) is a terrestrial globe produced by Martin Behaim from 1490–1492. The Erdapfel is the oldest surviving terrestrial globe. It is constructed of a laminated linen ball in two halves, reinforced with wood and overlaid with a map painted on gores by Georg Glockendon. The map was drawn on paper, which was pasted on a layer of parchment around the globe.

The Americas are not included, as Columbus returned to Spain no sooner than March 1493. The globe shows an enlarged Eurasian continent and an empty ocean between Europe and Asia. The mythical Saint Brendan's Island is included. Cipangu (Japan) is oversized and well south of its true position; Martellus's map is followed in developing an enormous phantom peninsula east of the Golden Chersonese (Malaysia).

The idea to call the globe "apple" may be related to the Reichsapfel ("Imperial Apple", Globus cruciger) which was also kept in Nuremberg along with the Imperial Regalia (Reichskleinodien). The name is not related to the modern meaning of Erdapfel in southern Germany and Austria, which is "potato"—potatoes had not yet been brought from America to Europe.

From its creation until early in the 16th century, it stood in a reception room in the Nuremberg town hall. After that time, it was held by the Behaim family. In 1907, it was transferred to the Germanic Museum in Nuremberg. In 1992, it was moved for some time to the Vienna University of Technology, to be studied at high resolution by the Behaim Digital Globe Project. In 2011, a second digitalization by the German National Museum began.

Terrestrial globes are known to have been made from antiquity, such as The Globe of Crates. None are known to have survived, even as fragments. A celestial globe, the Farnese Atlas, has survived from the second century AD.

See also
Early world maps
Lenox Globe
Ostrich Egg Globe

References

Further reading

External links
The International Coronelli Society for the Study of Globes
Detailed analysis (Archive.org backup link)

Historic maps of the world
Collections of the Germanisches Nationalmuseum
1492 works
15th-century maps and globes